Google TV (formerly known as Google Play Movies & TV) is an online video on demand service operated by Google. The service offers movies and television shows for purchase or rental, depending on availability. The service initially launched in May 2011 as Google Movies and was later renamed Google Play Movies & TV following its integration into the Google Play digital distribution service in 2012.

Google claims that most content is available in high definition, and a 4K Ultra HD video option was offered for select titles starting in December 2016. Content can be watched on streaming devices, the Google Play website, through an extension for the Google Chrome web browser, or through the mobile app on Android and iOS devices. Offline download is supported through the mobile app and on devices.

In September 2020, the Android app for Google Play Movies & TV was renamed to Google TV on Android devices in the United States, adding aggregation of content across streaming services. The rebranding coincided with the debut of an identically-named user interface for the Android TV operating system on the Chromecast with Google TV media streamer. The Google TV user interface is deeply integrated with the Google TV video service. In March 2021, users were informed that the app used on several TVs would no longer be available in June 2021 and users should use the YouTube app instead. The service expanded to iOS in June 2022.

Features 
Google TV offers movies and television shows for purchase or rental, depending on availability. Google states that "Most movies and TV shows on Google Play are available in high definition", with a resolution of 1,280×720 pixels (720p) or 1,920×1,080 pixels (1080p). Google added a 4K Ultra HD video option for select titles in December 2016, and began offering content in 4K HDR quality in the United States and Canada in July 2017. Users can pre-order select content to have it delivered automatically at the time of release. Rented content has an expiration time, listed on the content's detail page.

Platforms 
On computers, content can be watched on a dedicated Movies & TV section of the Google Play website, or through the Google Play Movies & TV Google Chrome web browser extension. However HD or 4K playback is not available on PC. The resolution will be capped to SD (480p) except when using Safari on a Mac.

On smartphones and tablets running the Android or iOS mobile operating systems, content can be watched on the Google TV mobile app.

Offline download and viewing is supported on Chromebooks through the Chrome extension, and on Android and iOS through the mobile app. Computers running Microsoft Windows and macOS operating systems cannot download content.

In order to view content on a television, users can either connect their computer to a TV with an HDMI cable, use the Google Play Movies & TV app available for select smart TVs from LG and Samsung as well as Roku devices, stream content through the Chromecast dongle, through the YouTube app on Amazon Fire TV, Apple TV, PlayStation 4, PlayStation 5, Xbox One, Xbox Series X/S and Nintendo Switch devices, or through Android TV devices.

In April 2021, Google began to deprecate the Google Play Movies & TV app on Roku, LG, Samsung, and Vizio smart TVs, redirecting users on these platforms to the YouTube app. The existing app was shut down on July 15.

Geographic availability 

Movies on Google Play are available in over 111 countries.

The full country list includes: Albania, Angola, Antigua and Barbuda, Argentina, Armenia, Aruba, Australia, Austria, Azerbaijan, Bahrain, Belarus, Belgium, Belize, Benin, Bolivia, Bosnia and Herzegovina, Botswana, Brazil, Burkina Faso, Cambodia, Canada, Cape Verde, Chile, Colombia, Costa Rica, Croatia, Cyprus, Czech Republic, Denmark, Dominican Republic, Ecuador, Egypt, El Salvador, Estonia, Finland, Fiji, France, Gabon, Germany, Greece, Guatemala, Haiti, Honduras, Hong Kong, Hungary, Iceland, India, Indonesia, Ireland, Italy, Ivory Coast, Jamaica, Japan, Jordan, Kazakhstan, Kyrgyzstan, Kuwait, Lao People's Democratic Republic, Latvia, Lebanon, Lithuania, Luxembourg, Macedonia, Malaysia, Mali, Malta, Mauritius, Mexico, Moldova, Namibia, the Netherlands, Nepal, New Zealand, Nicaragua, Niger, Norway, Oman, Panama, Papua New Guinea, Paraguay, Peru, the Philippines, Poland, Portugal, Qatar, Rwanda, Russia, Saudi Arabia, Senegal, Serbia, Singapore, Slovakia, Slovenia, South Africa, South Korea, Spain, Sri Lanka, Sweden, Switzerland, Taiwan, Tajikistan, Tanzania, Thailand, Togo, Trinidad and Tobago, Turkey, Turkmenistan, Uganda, Ukraine, the United Arab Emirates, the United Kingdom, the United States, Uruguay, Uzbekistan, Venezuela, Vietnam, Zambia and Zimbabwe.

TV shows on Google Play are only available in: Australia, Austria, Canada, France, Germany, Japan, Switzerland, the United Kingdom and the United States.

History of expansion 
The service was launched in May 2011 as Google Movies, and rebranded under the "Google Play" banner in March 2012. Movies were introduced in Korea in September 2012, with further rollouts of movies in Australia, Canada, the United Kingdom, France, and Spain in October 2012; movies in Brazil and Russia in December 2012; movies in India and Mexico in March 2013; TV shows in the United Kingdom in July 2013; and movies in Italy in November 2013. A major expansion of movies was made in 13 new countries in December 2013, and 38 new countries in March 2014. Subsequent rollouts took place for movies in Belgium, Philippines, Switzerland, and Uganda in May 2014; movies in Ireland in July 2014; movies in Austria in September 2014; movies in Bosnia-Herzegovina, Cyprus, Hungary, Iceland, Macedonia, Malta, Slovenia, Taiwan, and Ukraine in November 2014; movies in Indonesia, Malaysia, and Singapore in July 2015; movies in Turkey in March 2016; and movies in Bahrain, Egypt, Jordan, Kuwait, Lebanon, Oman, Qatar, Saudi Arabia, the United Arab Emirates, and Vietnam in November 2016.

References

External links 
 

TV
Transactional video on demand
Google Play
Computer-related introductions in 2012